DWWG (101.5 FM), broadcasting as 101.5 Big Sound FM, is a radio station owned and operated by Vanguard Radio Network. It serves as the flagship station of the Big Sound FM network. The station's studio and transmitter are located at Pan-Philippine Highway, Brgy. Sangitan East, Cabanatuan. This is the pioneer FM station in the city.

References

Radio stations established in 1981
Radio stations in Nueva Ecija